José de Almeida (born 4 October 1904, date of death unknown) was a Brazilian sprinter. He competed in the 100 metres at the 1932 Summer Olympics and the 1936 Summer Olympics.

References

External links

1904 births
Year of death missing
Athletes (track and field) at the 1932 Summer Olympics
Athletes (track and field) at the 1936 Summer Olympics
Brazilian male sprinters
Olympic athletes of Brazil
Athletes from Rio de Janeiro (city)
20th-century Brazilian people